The Man Who Woke Up is a lost 1918 American silent film directed by James McLaughlin and featuring William V. Mong.

Cast
William V. Mong as William Oglesby
Pauline Starke as Edith Oglesby
George Hernandez as Thomas Foster
Estelle Evans as Sylvia Oglesby
Darrell Foss as Foster's Son
Harry Depp as G. Waldo Campbell
George C. Pearce as Judge Campbell (as George Pearce)
Jean Calhoun as Dorothy Foster
Jim Blackwell On Hand (as J. Blackwell)
Alberta Lee as Undetermined Role

References

Library of Congress. Copyright Office. Catalog of copyright entries Part 4, Volumes 13-14: p. 146.

External links
 
 
 

1918 films
American silent feature films
American black-and-white films
Lost American films
1910s American films